NGC 7059 is a nearby spiral galaxy located about 70 million light-years away in the constellation of Pavo. NGC 7059 was discovered by astronomer John Herschel on July 22, 1835.

See also 
 List of NGC objects (7001–7840)
 NGC 224

References

External links 

Spiral galaxies
Pavo (constellation)
7059
66784
Astronomical objects discovered in 1835